Euparkerella brasiliensis is a species of frog in the family Strabomantidae.
It is endemic to Brazil.
Its natural habitats are subtropical or tropical moist lowland forest and rural gardens.
It is threatened by habitat loss.

References

brasiliensis
Endemic fauna of Brazil
Amphibians of Brazil
Taxonomy articles created by Polbot
Amphibians described in 1925